Weybridge railway station is near the established midpoint of Weybridge in Surrey, England and south of its town centre. It is on the South West Main Line and operated by South Western Railway.

History
The station was opened by the London and Southampton Railway on 21 May 1838. The line is set in a deep cutting at this point: the main station buildings are at street level on the Up side of the station and are linked to the platforms by stairs and a footbridge. Up and Down platforms serve the slow lines; there is a bay platform on the up side, from which trains operate on the Chertsey or Weybridge Branch of the Waterloo to Reading Line. Stops on this line include the main towns and villages of Runnymede and it gives Weybridge's longer route to Waterloo via Staines. This service can also be used to provide a cheaper and quicker route to the Great Western Main Line, by changing at Virginia Water for the service to Reading from Waterloo, for passengers on or by the South West Main Line but not near the North Downs Line.

Service

South Western Railway operate northbound services to London Waterloo, via Surbiton or Chertsey, inner suburban southbound services to Woking and outer suburban services to Basingstoke.

The typical off-peak Monday to Friday service is:

Platform 1

 2tph to London Waterloo via Staines and Hounslow

Platform 2

 4tph to London Waterloo via Surbiton (2 fast, 2 semi-fast)

Platform 3

 2tph to Basingstoke via Woking and Farnborough
 2tph to Woking

Amenities and immediate surroundings
A pub with large car park, nightclub and Saint George's Hill adjoin the north and east of the station respectively.  The business estate, museum of Brooklands and Brooklands College adjoin the other sides.  The station is close to the approximate midpoint of the medieval parish boundaries of Weybridge.

Bus routes 436, 515 and the Cobham Chatterbus serve the station.

Notes

References

External links

 Notes including photographs

Railway stations in Surrey
DfT Category C2 stations
Railway stations in Great Britain opened in 1838
Former London and South Western Railway stations
Railway stations served by South Western Railway
Weybridge, Surrey